Julia zebra is a species of a sea snail with a shell comprising two separate hinged pieces or valves. It is a marine gastropod mollusk in the family Juliidae.

Distribution
The type locality for this species is Yamaguchi Prefecture, Japan.

This species is found in Japan, Hawaii, Midway Atoll and Raratonga and Magaia (the Cook Islands).

References

Juliidae
Gastropods described in 1981